Capsicum mirabile is a wild species of the genus Capsicum, which is found in the rainforests of Brazil. It was first described botanically in 1846.

References

mirabile